The 2014 New York State Senate elections were held on November 4, 2014, to elect representatives from all 63 State Senate districts in the U.S. state of New York.

Republican candidates won 32 seats, while Democratic candidates won 31. The 41st, 46th, and 55th district flipped from Republican-controlled to Democratic-controlled, while the 60th district flipped from Republican-controlled to Democratic-controlled.

Dean Skelos and Andrea Stewart-Cousins retained their roles as Majority and Minority leader.

Notes

References 

Senate
New York State Senate
New York State Senate elections